The Sech'ŏn Line is an electrified  long railway line of the Korean State Railway in North Korea, connecting Sinhakpo on the Hambuk Line with  Chungbong.

History
The line was opened in 1920 by the privately owned Tomun Railway, at the same time as the rest of the first stage of its mainline, from Hoeryŏng to Sangsambong.  It was subsequently nationalised by the Chosen Government Railway in 1929, and from 1934 to 1940 it was managed by the South Manchuria Railway.  Finally, after the partition of Korea it became part of the Korean State Railway.

Services  
Coal is shipped from mines on this line to the Kim Chaek Iron & Steel Complex at Kimchaek and the Ch'ŏngjin Steel Works in Ch'ŏngjin, and there are commuter trains that operate between Hoeryŏng and Sech'ŏn via Sinhakp'o.

Route 

A yellow background in the "Distance" box indicates that section of the line is not electrified.

References

Railway lines in North Korea
Standard gauge railways in North Korea